Jnr Choi (born 20 May 1999) is a Gambian Rapper, singer-songwriter and model based in London, United Kingdom. He rose to prominence with his 2021 single To The Moon which gained popularity on Tiktok and led charts across the world, including peaking at number 38 on the US Billboard hot 100 and number 1 on the Rhythmic airplay charts.

Early life 
Jnr Choi was born in The Gambia, West Africa and relocated to Thamesmead, South-East London where he grew up, before relocating to Essex to pursue a career in modelling.

Career

Modelling Career 
Choi started his career as a model where he worked for companies like Givenchy, Philipp Plein, AMIRI and Marcelo Burlon.

Musical career 
After modelling for years, Choi picked interest in music in 2016 after listening to The Weeknd 2012 compilation album Trilogy, which was suggested to him by his friend. He became inspired and captivated. He didn't record until 2018 when he released his debut single, "Moves". since then he has released multiple singles including "Undress" featuring Mitchy Iris, "BEVEDERE" and "Reality". His debut studio album "SS21" was released in 2021 and his breakthrough single, "To The Moon" which sampled Bruno Mars 2010 single “Talking to the Moon,” was released sampling British star, Sam Tompkins (which later was credited as a feature). "To The Moon" was later remixed by Gunna, Fivio Foreign and Russ Millions in 2022. Same year his single "Tick Tock" was released.

References

External link 

 Jnr Choi at AllMusic

Living people
1999 births
Gambian musicians
British models
British musicians
British people of Gambian descent